The fourth and final season of the American television drama series Mistresses premiered on May 30, 2016, on ABC. The series is based on the UK series of the same name and was adapted by K.J. Steinberg, it stars Yunjin Kim, Rochelle Aytes, Jes Macallan and Tabrett Bethell as the four lead characters.

Cast

Main cast
 Yunjin Kim as Dr. Karen Kim
 Rochelle Aytes as April Malloy
 Jes Macallan as Josslyn "Joss" Carver
 Brett Tucker as Harry Davis
 Rob Mayes as Marc Nickleby
 Tabrett Bethell as Kate Davis

Recurring cast
 Corinne Massiah as Lucy Malloy
 Jerry O'Connell as Robert
 Brian Gattas as Randy
 Navid Negahban as Jonathan Amadi
 Ian Harvie as Michael Hester
 Ella Thomas as Jackie
 Alanna Masterson as Lydia
 Camila Banus as Kylie
 David Sutcliffe as Adam
 Tia Mowry as Barbara Rutledge
 Lynn Whitfield as Marjorie
 Justin Hartley as Scott Trosman
 Haley Ramm as Stacey North

Guest cast
 Micky Shiloah as Reza
 Ed Quinn as Alec Adams
 Jarod Joseph as Wilson Corvo
 Jason George as Dominic Taylor
 Wilson Cruz as Dante
 Matthew Del Negro as Jacob
 Nathalie Kelley as Kristen Sorbonne
 Hina Abdullah as Mysterious "Karen Kim"

Production
On September 25, 2015, ABC renewed Mistresses for a fourth season, consisting of 14 episodes, which began filming on February 27, 2016. On February 19, 2016, it was announced that Tabrett Bethell, who previously guest starred as Kate Davis in season two for one episode, returned in the remaining lead role during the fourth season from the second episode. Jerry O'Connell is set to recur this season as Robert, Karen's new nanny who also moonlights as an actor. O'Connell will also direct a few episodes later in the season.
Tia Mowry will also recur as Barbara Rutledge, a literary agent who signs with Karen. Navid Negahban and Micky Shiloah will both recur this season. Negahban is set to play Jonathan Amadi, an uber-successful Persian businessman who helps finance Harry's business expansion; while Shiloah will recur as Jonathan's privileged nephew, Reza. Ian Harvie has also been tapped for the recurring role of Michael Hester, a rich financier who hires April to decorate his house. Ella Thomas will also recur throughout this season as Jackie, a fitness instructor that befriends Joss. David Sutcliffe will recur in the role of Adam, an extremely handsome, charming and confident suitor of Karen's. Wilson Cruz is also set to guest star this season as Dante, Harry's new personal shopper. Lynn Whitfield is set to return in the role of April's mother Marjorie, for a guest appearance.

Episodes

Ratings

References

External links
 
 

04
2016 American television seasons